Lauro Kurtz Airport  is the airport serving Passo Fundo, Brazil.

It is managed by contract by Infraero.

History
The airport was renovated in 2007. In January 2021 the airport was closed for the renovation of the runway and construction of a new terminal. It was re-opened on April 8, 2022.

On April 4, 2022 the State of Rio Grande do Sul signed a contract of operation with Infraero. Previously the airport was operated by DAP.

Airlines and destinations

Accidents and incidents
1 July 1963: a Varig Douglas C-47B-20-DK registration PP-VBV flying from Porto Alegre and Carazinho to Passo Fundo collided with trees on high ground and crashed shortly before arriving in Passo Fundo. Of the 18 passengers and crew aboard, 15 died.

Access

See also

List of airports in Brazil

References

External links

Airports in Rio Grande do Sul